Solis is a Spanish name derived from the Latin sol, literally meaning sun.

Solis, Solís, de Solís,  or de Solis may refer to:

 Solis (film), a 2018 film directed by Carl Strathie
 Solís, a fictional country in the 2018 video game Just Cause 4
 Synoptic Optical Long-term Investigations of the Sun, a solar telescope

People 
 Marco Antonio Solis (Dec 29, 1959) Mexican musician, singer, composer, and record producer
 Alonso Solís (born 1978), Costa Rican footballer
 Alonso de Solís, Spanish explorer and governor of Florida in 1576
 Antonio de Solís y Ribadeneyra (1610–1686), Spanish dramatist and historian
 Brian Solis, American marketing executive
 Daniel Solis, Chicago alderman (25th Ward), 1996–2019
 Guillermo Scholz Solis (born 1947), Chilean chess master
 Fermín Solís, Spanish cartoonist 
 Fulgencio García de Solís, acting Governor of Florida from 1752 to 1755, and Governor of Honduras from 1757 to 1759
 Gabrielle Solis, a fictional character on the ABC drama Desperate Housewives
 Gerardo Octavio Solís Gómez,  Mexican politician, member of the National Action Party who has served as substitute Governor of Jalisco.
 Hilda Solis, U.S. Secretary of Labor (2009-2013), former Congresswoman for the 32nd District of California (D)
 Javier Solís, Mexican Singer
 Juan Díaz de Solís, Spanish navigator and explorer
 Jose Solis, Texas state representative, lawyer ex-con
 Magdalena Solís, Mexican serial killer 
 Mauricio Solís, Costa Rican footballer
 Merced Solis, better known as Tito Santana (born 1953), American professional wrestler
 Odlanier Solís Cuban professional boxer.
 Oscar A. Solis, Bishop of the Roman Catholic Diocese of Salt Lake City
 Ottón Solís, Costa Rican politician and former presidential candidate
 Patti Solis Doyle, American political operative in the 2008 Clinton and Obama campaigns
 Virgil Solis, 16th century German draughtsman and printmaker in engraving, etching and wood

See also
 Soliz, a surname